is a Japanese politician of the Liberal Democratic Party (LDP), a member of the House of Representatives in the Diet (national legislature). A native of Kasugai, Aichi and graduate of Tamagawa University, he was elected for the first time in 2005 after an unsuccessful run in 2003. He was defeated in the 2009 election by DPJ candidate Yoshihiro Ishida.

References 
  NB: The source incorrectly states he is originally from the city of Kasukabe in Aichi.

External links 
  in Japanese.

1972 births
Living people
Koizumi Children
Members of the House of Representatives from Aichi Prefecture
Liberal Democratic Party (Japan) politicians